Pyrestini is a tribe of beetles in the subfamily Cerambycinae, containing the following genera most of which are from the Oriental region, many being reddish in colour:

 Cymaterus
 Erythresthes
 Erythrus 
 Pachylocerus 
 Plutonesthes 
 Pyrestes

References

Cerambycinae
Beetle tribes